The 1903 Tennessee Docs football team represented University of Tennessee College of Medicine as an independent during the 1903 college football season. The team was beaten by the Cumberland Bulldogs, co-champions of the Southern Intercollegiate Athletic Association (SIAA), 86 to 0. The Tennessee Docs also lost to Ole Miss 17 to 0.

Schedule

References

Tennessee Docs
Tennessee Docs football seasons
College football winless seasons
Tennessee Docs football